Los Cerrillos may refer to:

 Los Cerrillos, New Mexico, Santa Fe County, New Mexico, USA
 Cerrillos, Uruguay, Canelones Department, Uruguay
 Los Cerrillos, Argentina, San Javier Department, Córdoba, Argentina
 Los Cerrillos Airport, located in Santiago de Chile, Chile

See also 
 Cerrillos (disambiguation)